Surinder Singh Bajwa (c. 1955 – 21 October 2007) was the Deputy Mayor of Delhi. He was a member of the Bharatiya Janata Party and was elected councilor for the Anand Vihar ward in April 2007.

On 20 October 2007 Bajwa was attacked by a group of rhesus macaques at his home and fell from a first floor balcony, suffering serious head injuries. On 21 October 2007 he died from those injuries.

References

1950s births
2007 deaths
Punjabi people
Indian Sikhs
Bharatiya Janata Party politicians from Delhi
Delhi politicians
Deaths due to animal attacks
Primate attacks
Businesspeople from Delhi
Accidental deaths in India